Steptoe or Stepto  may refer to:

People

Amanda Stepto (born 1970), Canadian actress
Andrew Steptoe (born 1951), British psychologist and epidemiologist, University College London
Edward Steptoe (1815–1865), officer in the United States Army in the Mexican-American War and the Indian Wars
George Steptoe Washington (1771–1809), planter, militia officer and nephew of the first US President George Washington
James Steptoe Johnston (1843–1924), American Confederate veteran, preacher and educator
Javaka Steptoe, American author and illustrator, winner of the 2017 Caldecott Medal
John Steptoe (1950–1989), author and illustrator for children’s books dealing with the African-American experience
Lamont B. Steptoe (born 1949), American poet, photographer and publisher
Lydia Steptoe, pen-name of Djuna Barnes (1892–1982), American writer and artist known for her novel Nightwood (1936)
Patrick Steptoe CBE FRS (1913–1988), British obstetrician, gynaecologist and a pioneer of fertility treatment
Roger Steptoe (born 1953), English composer and pianist
 Nickname for Stephen Toulouse, the former director of Xbox LIVE Policy and Enforcement at Microsoft
Syndric Steptoe (born 1984), former gridiron football wide receiver

Places

Steptoe Butte, quartzite island in Whitman County, Washington, in the northwest United States
Steptoe and Kamiak Buttes, 1,144-acre (463 ha) National Natural Landmark in Whitman County, Washington, designated in 1965
Steptoe Battlefield State Park, three-acre (1.2 ha) heritage site on the southeast side of Rosalia in Whitman County, Washington
Steptoe Valley, long basin located in White Pine County, in northeastern Nevada in the western United States
Steptoe, Washington, small unincorporated rural town in Whitman County, Washington, United States

Other

Steptoe Disaster (Battle of Pine Creek), a conflict between United States Army forces and members of Native American tribes
Steptoe & Johnson, international law firm headquartered in Washington, D.C.
Steptoe and Son, British television sitcom about a father-and-son rag-and-bone business
Steptoe and Son (film), 1972 British comedy drama film and a spin-off from the television sitcom

See also
The Curse of Steptoe, television play first broadcast in 2008 on BBC Four
John Steptoe Award for New Talent, annual award presented by the Ethnic & Multicultural Information Exchange Round Table
Stepstone